This was the first of the three tournaments held in Belgrade for the 2021 tennis season. Belgrade also hosted a joint ATP/WTA tournament.

Guillermo Durán and Andrés Molteni won the title after defeating Tomislav Brkić and Nikola Ćaćić 6–4, 6–4 in the final.

Seeds

Draw

References

External links
 Main draw

2021 ATP Challenger Tour
2021 Doubles